Dianthus crenatus is a species of flowering plant in the family Caryophyllaceae, indigenous to the Western Cape (Swellendam), Eastern Cape and KwaZulu-Natal Provinces of South Africa.

Description
Dianthus crenatus is a perennial with leafy stems. The leaves spread along the middle of the stems are circa 50 mm long, and 3-5 mm broad (the basal leaves are often shorter). 
 
The petals are sub-entire to toothed, each exserted for a length of 15-20 mm, and 10-15 mm broad. 
The stout calyx is circa 25 mm in length.

References

 

crenatus
Flora of South Africa
Renosterveld